Lewis N. Wolff (born December 13, 1935) is an American real estate developer. Wolff had been co-chairman of the Board of Sunstone Investors, Inc. from October 2004 to April 2014. Wolff owned sports franchises, serving currently as the co-owner of the San Jose Earthquakes of Major League Soccer. He was most well known for his ownership of the Oakland Athletics. However, in November 2016, Wolff sold his share in the Oakland Athletics to John J. Fisher, and currently serves as the team's Chairman Emeritus. Wolff is credited with the redevelopment and revitalization of downtown San Jose, California where he was the largest developer of offices, hotels, and parking for many years.

Early life and education
Lewis "Lew" Wolff was born on December 13, 1935 to a Jewish family in St. Louis and was raised in the middle-class suburbs of University City, Missouri. Wolff graduated from the University of Wisconsin-Madison where he was a member of the Pi Lambda Phi fraternity, and a fraternity brother of former MLB Commissioner Bud Selig. and US Senator Herb Kohl. In 1961, he earned an MBA from the Olin Business School at Washington University in St. Louis.

Career
In 1958, Wolff took a job as a real estate appraiser in St. Louis. In 1961, his company sent him to Los Angeles to open a regional office and in 1963, he co-founded a real estate consulting firm. In the 1960s, he was very successful developing the booming San Jose market and earned a solid reputation in the industry. In the 1970s, he accepted a position with 20th Century Fox tasked with managing its worldwide real estate investments. Wolff's approach was to find partners willing to fund the majority of the investment and take a more passive role, which would allow Wolff to directly manage the investment himself.

In 1994, Wolff founded Maritz, Wolff & Co with Philip Maritz in St. Louis, Missouri. The company owned interest in eighteen hotel and resort properties around the world, including the Fairmont San Jose Hotel, the Fairmont San Francisco, the Carlyle Hotel, the Four Seasons Hotel Nevis, the Four Seasons Hotel Toronto, and the Park Hyatt Sydney. In 2011 Wolff and his partner, Philip Maritz, orchestrated the $800 million sale of five hotels, including The Carlyle and the Rosewood Management Company to New World, a Hong Kong-based real estate and hotel company.

In the past, he has been a co-owner of the St. Louis Blues of the National Hockey League and the Golden State Warriors of the National Basketball Association. On April 1, 2005, Wolff and an ownership group led by The Gap heir, John J. Fisher, purchased the Oakland Athletics baseball team for $180 million from Stephen Schott and Ken Hofmann. In 2006, the A's ownership group purchased an option to revive the San Jose Earthquakes franchise of Major League Soccer. At the 2007 MLS All Star Game, it was announced that Wolff had exercised the option, and the Earthquakes began play during the 2008 MLS season.

Philanthropy 
Under Wolff's ownership, the Oakland Athletics were community-minded. In 2011, Sony Pictures complied with Wolff's wishes in staging the motion picture premiere of Moneyball in Oakland, including a charity component that raised $370,000 for the Children's Hospital and Research Center Oakland and Stand Up To Cancer. Lew is also an active participant in the A's Home Run Readers program.

The San Jose Mercury-News ranked Wolff first in its annual listing of the Bay Area's 25 Most Powerful Sports Figures in both 2006 and 2007. In September, 2008, the Silicon Valley Leadership Group also presented Wolff with its prestigious "Community Cornerstone Award," given to "a Silicon Valley leader who has displayed a lifetime of impeccable ethics, business achievement and community engagement."  Wolff’s Family Foundation supports numerous causes with emphasis on Stand-Up to Cancer, KIPP Charter schools, Planned Parenthood, Yavneh Day School, Los Gatos, California. The most recent activity is a personal campaign to research and address the impact of Narcissistic Personality Disorder (NPD) in the field of family law and children of divorce.

Stadium efforts 
In 2015, Wolff claimed that the A's are "looking to stay in Oakland. ... We have not been looking at venues in other places in the Bay Area," he said. "And we are not planning to look." In 2014, the A's signed a 10-year lease to stay in the O.co Coliseum. Shortly thereafter, the A's invested $10 million in new video boards at the Coliseum as part of the lease agreement.

Personal life
Wolff is married to Jean Wolff and has three children and four grandchildren. They live in the Westwood neighborhood of Los Angeles.

References

External links
Wolff Urban website
Maritz Wolff website

Oakland Athletics owners
San Jose Earthquakes
American hoteliers
Jewish American philanthropists
University of Wisconsin–Madison alumni
Olin Business School (Washington University) alumni
Major League Baseball owners
Major League Soccer executives
American soccer chairmen and investors
Washington University in St. Louis alumni
Businesspeople from St. Louis
Living people
Businesspeople from the San Francisco Bay Area
1935 births
People from Westwood, Los Angeles